Willi Behnisch (born 1956 in Buenos Aires) is an Argentine cinematographer, film director, and screenplay writer. Most of his work is as a cinematographer. He is sometimes credited as Jorge Guillermo Behnisch.

Three of his most recent films he shot have been critically well received: Un Oso Rojo (2002), 18-j (2004), and Ay Juancito (2004).

Filmography (partial)
Cinematography
 El Astillero (2000)
 La Fé del volcán (2001)
 Entre los dioses del desprecio (2001) 
 Un Oso Rojo (2002)  A Red Bear 
 Cantata de las cosas solas (2003) 
 Extraño (2003) a.k.a. Strange
 18-j (2004) 
 Ay Juancito (2004) 
 Cuatro mujeres descalzas (2005)
 Las Manos (2006) 
 Hamaca paraguaya (2006) a.k.a. Paraguayan Hammock 
 Si fuera yo un helecho (2006)

References

External links
 
 

1956 births
Argentine cinematographers
Living people
Argentine people of German descent
Place of birth missing (living people)